Svein Bendik Manum (3 October 1926 - 30 September 2015) was a Norwegian botanist.

He took his education at the University of Oslo, and was hired there in 1954. From 1975 to 1995 he served as a professor of paleobotany, being a specialist on fossil land flora and fossil microalgae. He had a spell as university professor in Uganda from 1967 to 1970. He was a fellow of the Norwegian Academy of Science and Letters.

He resided in Lommedalen.

References

1926 births
2015 deaths
20th-century Norwegian botanists
Paleobotanists
University of Oslo alumni
Academic staff of the University of Oslo
Norwegian expatriates in Uganda
Members of the Norwegian Academy of Science and Letters
People from Bærum